ES Sétif are an Algerian professional football club based in Sétif, who currently play in the Ligue 1. This list details ES Sétif's achievements in major competitions, together with the top scorers for each season.

The club has won a total of 24 major trophies, including the national championship 8 times also won the Algerian Cup a record 8 times, the Algerian Super Cup 2 times, and the UAFA Club Cup 2 times ES Sétif won the CAF Champions League 2 times, CAF Super Cup 1 time and defunct cup Afro-Asian Club Championship 1 time. The club has also never been out of the top two divisions of Algerian football since entering the Football League.

This is a list of the seasons played by ES Sétif from 1962 when the club first entered a league competition to the most recent seasons. The club's achievements in all major national and international competitions as well as the top scorers are listed. Top scorers in bold were also top scorers of Ligue 1. The list is separated into three parts, coinciding with the three major episodes of Algerian football:

History

Seasons

Key 

Key to league record:
P = Played
W = Games won
D = Games drawn
L = Games lost
GF = Goals for
GA = Goals against
Pts = Points
Pos = Final position

Key to divisions:
1 = Ligue 1
2 = Ligue 2

Key to rounds:
DNE = Did not enter
Grp = Group stage
R1 = First Round
R2 = Second Round
R32 = Round of 32

R16 = Round of 16
QF = Quarter-finals
SF = Semi-finals
RU = Runners-up
W = Winners

Division shown in bold to indicate a change in division.
Top scorers shown in bold are players who were also top scorers in their division that season.

Honours 
As of the 2018–19 season, Entente Sportive Sétifienne have won a total of 22 titles (regional competitions not considered), of which 18 were achieved domestically and 4 in international competitions. The club's most recent honour is the 2018–19 Algerian Ligue Professionnelle 1.

National

African

Regional

Doubles and trebles 
Doubles: (1967–68, 2011–12)
Trebles:

Notes

References 

 

Seasons
ES Setif